Dája Bedáňová was the defending champion, but lost in the first round to Lilia Osterloh.

Rita Grande won the title by defeating Martina Suchá 6–1, 6–1 in the final.

Seeds

Draw

Finals

Top half

Bottom half

References

External links
 Official results archive (ITF)
 Official results archive (WTA)

WTA Bratislava
2001 in Slovak women's sport
2001 in Slovak tennis